Nathan Cook may refer to:

 Nathan Cook (actor) (1950–1988), American actor
 Nathan Cook (producer), American record producer
 Nathan E. Cook (1885–1992), U.S. Navy veteran